Richard Steven Croushore (born August 7, 1970) is an American former professional baseball relief pitcher who played for three different teams between  and . Listed at 6' 4", 210 lb., Croushore batted and threw right-handed. He was signed by the St. Louis Cardinals as an amateur free agent in  out of James Madison University.

Croushore reached the Major League Baseball (MLB) in 1998 with the St. Louis Cardinals, spending two years with them before moving to the Colorado Rockies (2000) and Boston Red Sox (2000).

In a three-season career, Croushore had a 5–11 record with a 4.88 ERA and 11 saves in 111 appearances.

External links
, or Retrosheet, or Pura Pelota (VPBL stats)

1970 births
Living people
Albuquerque Isotopes players
American expatriate baseball players in Canada
Arkansas Travelers players
Baseball players from New Jersey
Boston Red Sox players
Colorado Rockies players
Colorado Springs Sky Sox players
Durham Bulls players
Glens Falls Redbirds players
Gulf Coast Orioles players
James Madison Dukes baseball players
Leones del Caracas players
American expatriate baseball players in Venezuela
Louisville Bats players
Louisville Redbirds players
Madison Hatters players
Major League Baseball pitchers
Memphis Redbirds players
Norfolk Tides players
Ottawa Lynx players
Pawtucket Red Sox players
People from Lakehurst, New Jersey
St. Louis Cardinals players
St. Lucie Mets players
St. Petersburg Cardinals players
Sportspeople from Ocean County, New Jersey
Shenandoah Hornets baseball coaches
Baseball coaches from New Jersey